Lake Hala (also: Hala Hu, Har Hu), is a closed lake ocated at 4078m above sea level in the Qilian mountains, at the northeastern margin of the Tibetan Plateau, Qinghai Province, China. 

It´s surface area is 596 km2. It is a brackish lake with a salinity of ca 1.8% (18 psu). The shore zone is relatively shallow, while the maximum depth at the center of the lake is 65 m. The lake catchment is a basin of 4690 km2 without an outflow. The highest surrounding mountains (Shule Nanshan north of the lake), exceed 5800 m above sea level. 

Due to the influence of the surrounding glaciers, the water level of the lake and its ecosystem reacts sensitive to meltwater pulses.

References

Lakes of Qinghai
Qinghai
Lakes of China
Tibetan Plateau